Mind Body & Soul is the second studio album by English singer and songwriter Joss Stone, released on 15 September 2004 by S-Curve Records. The album received generally favourable reviews from music critics and earned Stone three Grammy Award nominations, including Best New Artist and Best Pop Vocal Album.

Mind Body & Soul debuted at number one on the UK Albums Chart with 75,000 copies sold in its first week, making Stone the youngest female singer to top the chart. It also performed strongly on international record charts, reaching number 11 on the Billboard 200 in the United States and charting within the top 10 in several countries across Europe and Oceania.

Critical reception

Mind Body & Soul received generally positive reviews from music critics. At Metacritic, which assigns a normalised rating out of 100 to reviews from mainstream publications, the album received an average score of 64, based on 11 reviews. Stephen Thomas Erlewine from AllMusic noted that, compared to The Soul Sessions, "[c]ertain songs are a little brighter and a little more radio-ready than before, there's a more pronounced hip-hop vibe to some beats, and she sounds a little more like a diva this time around—not enough to alienate older fans, but enough to win some new ones. The album has a seductive, sultry feel; there's some genuine grit to the rhythms, yet it's all wrapped up in a production that's smooth as silk." John Murphy of musicOMH wrote that "[t]his is a terrific album, and on this basis Joss Stone is going to be a household name for years and years to come." Darryl Sterdan of Jam! wrote that "even if her contributions were limited to lyrics and melodies, she still comes through with flying colours, displaying a knack for sharp hooks and catchy choruses." Dan Gennoe of Yahoo! Music UK commented that songs like "Right to Be Wrong", "Jet Lag" and "Killing Time" "confirm that not only can she deliver pain and passion like a lover three times her age, she can write it like one too." He continued: "There's not a bad song here, but there are some that never make it out of the rootsy background."

Billboard critic Michael Paoletta stated that Stone "continues to reinvent soul music, injecting a very classic sound with contemporary sass and verve", while noting that "[t]hroughout, that voice reigns supreme." The Guardians Caroline Sullivan believed that "this record is best seen as a stepping stone by which she shouldn't be judged too exactingly." She also praised Stone's "ripening" voice, saying it is "foxier" than on The Soul Sessions. At Blender magazine, Robert Christgau opined that "this album's compromise with the teen-pop divahood she was groomed for will feel like a bid for authenticity. Stone's infatuation with band grooves provides relief from the radio-ready synthesizers and compressors." Dimitri Ehrlich of Vibe called the album "deeply refreshing", adding that "[t]here's nothing new here [...] but if your ears are inured to the dense, overly polished production of contemporary R&B, Stone's simplicity and rawness will come as a revelation." Laura Sinagra of Rolling Stone wrote, "As on her last album, tasteful retro organs and wah-wah dominate this batch of originals" and named "Spoiled" one of the album's "strongest moments", but felt that songs like "Don't Cha Wanna Ride" and "You Had Me" are "more Destiny's Child than yesterday's blues". In a mixed review, David Browne of Entertainment Weekly stated, "Save for a mild foray into reggae and a stab at power balladry, the tracks are monotonously midtempo, supper-club soul."

Accolades
At the 2005 Brit Awards, Stone won the awards for British Female Solo Artist and British Urban Act, and was nominated for British Breakthrough Act, becoming the youngest recipient of a Brit Award at age 17. That same year, Stone received three nominations at the 47th Annual Grammy Awards, including Best New Artist, Best Female Pop Vocal Performance for "You Had Me" and Best Pop Vocal Album for Mind Body & Soul. The album earned Stone a nomination for International Newcomer of the Year at Germany's Echo Awards in 2005.

Commercial performance
Mind Body & Soul entered the UK Albums Chart at number one with first-week sales of 75,000 copies, making Stone the youngest female singer to top the chart at 17 years and five months old, a record previously held by Avril Lavigne with her album Let Go (2002). The record was eventually broken by Billie Eilish in April 2019, when her album When We All Fall Asleep, Where Do We Go? debuted at number one on the UK Albums Chart while she was 17 years and three months old. It also became the first number-one album for Relentless Records. The album spent one week atop the UK Albums Chart, and was certified triple platinum by the British Phonographic Industry (BPI) on 9 September 2005. As of July 2012, Mind Body & Soul had sold 940,617 copies in the United Kingdom. The album debuted at number 11 on the Billboard 200 in the United States, selling 73,487 copies in its first week. It was certified platinum by the Recording Industry Association of America (RIAA) on 9 September 2005, and had sold 1.3 million copies in the US by July 2011.

Mind Body & Soul was successful in most European countries, peaking at number three on the European Top 100 Albums chart, while reaching the top five in Austria, Belgium, the Netherlands and Portugal, and the top 10 in France, Germany, Ireland, Norway and Switzerland. The International Federation of the Phonographic Industry (IFPI) certified the album platinum, denoting sales in excess of one million copies across Europe. In Oceania, the album reached number five in New Zealand and number seven in Australia, and has been certified gold by both the Australian Recording Industry Association (ARIA) and the Recording Industry Association of New Zealand (RIANZ).

Track listing

Notes
  signifies a vocal producer
 The actual duration of music on "Sleep Like a Child" is 5:19; the rest is filled with silence.

Sample credits
 "Don't Cha Wanna Ride" contains samples from "Soulful Strut" by Young-Holt Unlimited.

Personnel
Credits adapted from the liner notes of Mind Body & Soul.

Musicians

 Joss Stone – lead vocals ; backing vocals 
 AJ Nilo – guitar 
 Jack Daley – bass 
 Cindy Blackman – drums 
 Benny Latimore – piano ; Wurlitzer 
 Raymond Angry – B3 ; clavinet, Moog ; piano ; organ 
 Tom "Bones" Malone – flugelhorn ; trumpet, trombone, tenor saxophone, baritone saxophone 
 Angelo Morris – Fender Rhodes ; bass ; guitar 
 Betty Wright – background vocals 
 Bombshell – background vocals 
 Pete Iannacone – bass 
 Jonathan Joseph – drums 
 Nir Zidkyahu – percussion 
 Jonathan Shorten – Rhodes ; synthesiser, drum programming ; programming ; keyboards ; string arrangement 
 John Angier – string arrangement 
 Tracey Moore – background vocals 
 Mercedes Martinez – background vocals 
 Mike Mangini – programming ; bass ; keyboards 
 Steve Greenwell – programming ; bass 
 Nile Rodgers – guitar 
 David "Jody" Hill – drums 
 Willie "Little Beaver" Hale – guitar 
 Timmy Thomas – B3 ; organ 
 Thom Bell – string arrangement, horn arrangement 
 Delroy "Chris" Cooper – bass 
 Earl "Chinna" Smith – guitar 
 Astor "Crusty" Campbell – drums 
 Willburn "Squidley" Cole – additional drums 
 Commissioner Gordon – percussion, programming 
 Teodross Avery – saxophone 
 Tanya Darby – trumpet 
 Stafford Hunter – trombone 
 Conner Reeves – backing vocal arrangement, background vocals 
 Danny P. – guitar ; bass, Rhodes ; piano 
 Angie Stone – Rhodes 
 Margaret Reynolds – background vocals 
 Ellison Kendrick – background vocals 
 Veronica Sanchez – background vocals 
 Ruby Baker – background vocals 
 Clovette Danzy – background vocals 
 Jeanette Wright – background vocals 
 William "Kooly" Scott – background vocals 
 Salaam Remi – bass, Wurlitzer, organ, strings 
 Troy Auxilly-Wilson – drums 
 Van Gibbs – guitar 
 Vincent Henry – clarinet, alto saxophone, soprano saxophone 
 Bruce Purse – trumpet, flugelhorn 
 Jeni Fujita – background vocals 
 Carl Vandenbosche – percussion 
 Alan Weekes – electric guitar 
 Ignacio Nuñez – percussion 
 Ahmir "Questlove" Thompson – drums

Orchestra

 Sandra Park – violin
 Sharon Yamada – violin
 Lisa Kim – violin
 Tom Carney Myung-Hi Kim – violin
 Sarah Kim – violin
 Fiona Simon – violin
 Soo Hyun Kwon – violin
 Laura Seaton – violin
 Liz Lim – violin
 Jung Sun Yoo – violin
 Matt Lehmann – violin
 Matt Milewski – violin
 Krzysztof Kuznik – violin
 Jessica Lee – violin
 Dawn Hannay – viola
 Carol Cook – viola
 Vivek Kamath – viola
 Dan Panner – viola
 Kevin Mirkin – viola
 Brian Chen – viola
 Elizabeth Dyson – cello
 Jeanne LeBlan – cello
 Sarah Seiver – cello
 Eileen Moon – cello
 Phil Myers – French horn
 Pat Milando – French horn
 Dave Smith – French horn

Technical
 Michael Mangini – production ; mixing 
 Steve Greenberg – production ; executive production
 Betty Wright – production ; vocal production 
 Jonathan Shorten – production 
 Conner Reeves – production 
 Commissioner Gordon – production, engineering 
 Salaam Remi – production 
 Danny P. – production 
 The Boilerhouse Boys – production 
 Steve Greenwell – recording ; engineering ; mixing 
 Jamie Siegel – engineering 
 Gary "Mon" Noble – engineering 
 Shomoni "Sho" Dylan – engineering assistance 
 Chris Gehringer – mastering

Artwork
 David Gorman – art direction, design
 Bryan Lasley – art direction, design
 Aleeta Mayo – art direction, design
 Roger Moenks – photography
 Amy Touma – additional photography

Charts

Weekly charts

Year-end charts

Certifications

Release history

Notes

References

2004 albums
Albums produced by Salaam Remi
Albums recorded at Chung King Studios
Joss Stone albums
Pop albums by English artists
S-Curve Records albums
Virgin Records albums